Acicularia is a genus of green algae in the family Dasycladaceae.

References

Ulvophyceae genera
Dasycladaceae
Fossil algae